Perkins Run is a  long 2nd order tributary to the Delaware River in New Castle County, Delaware.  The run is named for the Perkins Farm that was located near the mouth.

Course
Perkins Run rises on the South Branch Naamans Creek divide in Arden, Delaware.  Perkins Creek then flows southeast to meet the Delaware River about 0.2 miles east of Holly Oak.

Watershed
Perkins Run drains  of area, receives about 46.5 in/year of precipitation, has a topographic wetness index of 458.40 and is about 16.7% forested.

See also
List of rivers of Delaware
List of Delaware River tributaries

References 

Rivers of Delaware
Tributaries of the Delaware River